Tolne railway station is a railway station serving the village of Tolne in Tolne hills in Vendsyssel, Denmark.

The station is located on the Vendsyssel Line from Aalborg to Frederikshavn, between Sindal station and Kvissel station. The train services are operated by the Nordjyske Jernbaner railway company that runs frequent regional train services to Aalborg and Frederikshavn.

History
The station opened in 1873 as a halt on the new Nørresundby-Frederikshavn railway line as the branch from Nørresundby to Frederikshavn opened on 16 August 1871. It was promoted to a station in 1879 when the station building designed by N.P.C. Holsøe was completed.

On 7 January 1879, at the opening of the Limfjord Railway Bridge, the Vendsyssel line was connected with Aalborg station, the Randers-Aalborg railway line and the rest of the Danish rail network.

The station was closed in 1972 but continued as a halt. The station building has been demolished. In 2017, operation of the regional rail services on the Vendsyssel Line to Aalborg and Frederikshavn were transferred from DSB to the local railway company Nordjyske Jernbaner.

References

Bibliography

External links

 Banedanmark – government agency responsible for maintenance and traffic control of most of the Danish railway network
 Nordjyske Jernbaner – Danish railway company operating in North Jutland Region
 Danske Jernbaner – website with information on railway history in Denmark
 Nordjyllands Jernbaner – website with information on railway history in North Jutland

Railway stations in the North Jutland Region
Railway stations opened in 1873
Railway stations in Denmark opened in the 19th century